BGET may refer to:

Bord Gáis Energy Theatre, Dublin
BGET, the ICAO airport code for Eqalugaarsuit Heliport